Neil Melesso (7 April 1931 – 25 February 2019) was an Australian rules footballer who played with South Melbourne in the Victorian Football League (VFL).

Notes

External links 

2019 deaths
1931 births
Australian rules footballers from Victoria (Australia)
Sydney Swans players